Nirsa Assembly constituency is an assembly constituency in the Indian state of Jharkhand.

Members of Assembly 
2005: Aparna Sengupta, All India Forward Bloc
2009: Arup Chatterjee, Marxist Co-ordination Committee
2014: Arup Chatterjee, Marxist Co-ordination Committee
2019: Aparna Sengupta, Bharatiya Janata Party

See also
Vidhan Sabha
List of states of India by type of legislature

References

Assembly constituencies of Jharkhand